Cornelius Comegys Jadwin (March 27, 1835 – August 17, 1913) was a Republican member of the U.S. House of Representatives from Pennsylvania.

Biography
Cornelius Comegys Jadwin was born in Carbondale, Pennsylvania.  He attended the common schools and taught school for four years.  He studied civil engineering and pharmacy.  He was engaged as a civil and mining engineer from 1857 to 1861.  He entered the drug business and located in Honesdale, Pennsylvania, in 1862.  He served on the board of education of his district for nine years and was president for three years.  He was a delegate to the 1880 Republican National Convention.

Jadwin elected as a Republican to the Forty-seventh Congress.  He was an unsuccessful Independent candidate for reelection in 1882.  He continued the drug business in Honesdale until his death there in 1913.  Interment in Glen Dyberry Cemetery.

Sources

The Political Graveyard

1835 births
1913 deaths
People from Lackawanna County, Pennsylvania
American pharmacists
Republican Party members of the United States House of Representatives from Pennsylvania
19th-century American politicians